XHRPO-FM is a radio station on 97.7 FM in Santa Cruz Amilpas, Oaxaca, serving the capital city of Oaxaca de Juárez. It is owned and operated by El Heraldo de México and carries its El Heraldo Radio news format.

History
XHRPO received its concession in 1963 as XERPO-AM 710. It was owned by Horacio Niño Medina and later by Sistema de Radiodifusión del Sureste, S.A.

It was sold to Grupo Radio México in 1994. On April 30, 2021, La Z ceased broadcasting after Grupo Radio Centro, Grupo Radio México's successor, reached a deal to sell XHRPO-FM to El Heraldo de México.

References

Radio stations in Oaxaca City